Watonga Lake is a reservoir in Blaine County, Oklahoma. Constructed by the Oklahoma Department of Wildlife Conservation (ODWC) in 1955, is adjacent to Roman Nose State Park, with which it shares many recreational facilities.

Etymology 
The name Watonga was that of an Arapaho tribe leader (also given as woteen-kotuh'oo) meaning "black coyote."

Description 
The lake is small, compared to many of the other lakes and reservoirs in the state.

References 

Bodies of water of Blaine County, Oklahoma
1955 establishments in Oklahoma
Reservoirs in Oklahoma